Double-talk is a form of speech in which inappropriate, invented, or nonsense words are interpolated into normal speech to give the appearance of knowledge, and thus confuse or amuse the audience. Vaudevillian Cliff Nazarro, for instance, would say, "Make yourself invidded, with the keforth and the grepps. Be great with the floom and the sonic keptefin."
 
Comedians who have used this as part of their act include Al Kelly, Danny Kaye, Gary Owens, Irwin Corey, Jackie Gleason, Jerry Lewis, Sid Caesar, Stanley Unwin, Reggie Watts, Vanessa Bayer and Cantinflas.

It has also been used in films, for example Charlie Chaplin's character in The Great Dictator.

See also
Bloviation
Doublespeak
Gibberish and gobbledygook
Jabberwocky
Jargon
Malapropism
Prisencolinensinainciusol
Spoonerism
Supercalifragilisticexpialidocious
Technobabble

Notes

Comedy
Vaudeville tropes